Greg Wolfgramm is a New Zealand former professional rugby league footballer who represented Tonga at the 2000 World Cup. He is the cousin of fellow Tongan international Willie.

Playing career
Wolfgramm attended St Paul's College where he played in the halves alongside Stacey Jones.

He played for the Richmond Bulldogs in the 1995 Auckland Rugby League competition.

A former Marist Saints player, Wolfgramm played for the Narrandera Lizards in Group 20 Rugby League in which he won a premiership with the Lizards in 1999.

Wolfgramm joined the Canberra Raiders in 2000 and spent three seasons at the club.

Representative career
Wolfgramm played for Tonga in the 1999 test match against New Zealand. He was then part of the squad for the 2000 World Cup.

References

Living people
New Zealand sportspeople of Tongan descent
New Zealand rugby league players
Tonga national rugby league team players
Canberra Raiders players
Marist Saints players
Richmond Bulldogs players
People educated at St Paul's College, Auckland
Rugby league centres
Rugby league wingers
1974 births